Indo-Iranian Journal is a peer-reviewed academic journal focusing on aspects of Indo-Iranian cultures. The journal was started by Jan Willem de Jong and Franciscus Bernardus Jacobus Kuiper in 1957 with Ludwig Alsdorf, Harold Walter Bailey, Louis Renou, Sumitra Mangesh Katre and Daniel H. H. Ingalls on its editorial board.
Currently its editor-in-chiefs are Peter Bisschop (Leiden University) and Jonathan Silk (Leiden University).

References

External links 
 

Indology journals
English-language journals
Publications established in 1957
Biannual journals
Brill Publishers academic journals
Iranian studies journals
Academic journals of Iran